The British group Steps have recorded songs for six studio albums (including a Christmas album), two greatest hits and a tribute album. The band formed in 1997 after responding to an advert in the magazine The Stage, which asked for people to audition for a place in a pop band. Out of the thousands who applied, Lee Latchford-Evans, Lisa Scott-Lee, Faye Tozer, Claire Richards, and Ian "H" Watkins were successful in securing a place. The techno-pop song "5,6,7,8" was released as their debut single in 1997 and was followed by their debut album Step One the following year. "5,6,7,8" has been noted for being distinctly different from their subsequent releases due to its novelty line-dancing style and male lead vocals, whereas their songs thereafter are mostly sung by Richards.

Their songs and musical style have often been compared to ABBA, with tracks such as "After the Love Has Gone" and "One for Sorrow" being so likened. The band members have occasionally co-written some of their songs, with all of them receiving songwriting credits for "Only in My Dreams" from their first greatest hits album, Gold: Greatest Hits (2001), while a large number of songs were written by Karl Twigg, Mark Topham, Andrew Frampton, and Pete Waterman. The group achieved thirteen consecutive top-five singles in the United Kingdom, including "Better Best Forgotten", "Say You'll Be Mine", "Deeper Shade of Blue", "It's the Way You Make Me Feel", and one of their two number-ones, "Stomp".

The group have covered a variety of well-known songs throughout their career, including their first number-one song "Tragedy" by the Bee Gees, "Chain Reaction" by Diana Ross, "Too Busy Thinking About My Baby" by The Temptations, and "Better the Devil You Know" by Kylie Minogue. In 1999, Steps recorded their own versions of "I Know Him So Well" and "Lay All Your Love on Me", as well as a medley entitled "Thank ABBA for the Music" for the ABBA tribute album; they also recorded "Dancing Queen" for their second greatest hits album, The Ultimate Collection (2011), and "Story of a Heart" for their fifth studio album, Tears on the Dancefloor (2017). Steps covered a selection of Christmas classics for their fourth studio album, Light Up the World (2012).

Songs

Cover versions and notes

References

Steps (group) songs
Steps